James Lewis Kraft (December 11, 1874 – February 16, 1953) was a Canadian-American entrepreneur and inventor. Kraft was the first to patent processed cheese.

Life and career
J. L. Kraft was born on December 11, 1874, near Stevensville, Ontario, Canada, located just north of Fort Erie, to Mennonite parents Minerva Alice née Tripp (1848–1933) and George Franklin Krafft (1842–1914), a farmer of German descent. He was the second of eleven children. Kraft was educated in the Stevensville area (S.S. No. 9) and worked nearby at Ferguson's General store in Fort Erie, Ontario, from 1901 to 1902.

According to J.L.'s  niece, Alice Anderson née Kraft, with a photograph from the late 1800s, or beginning of 1900, the Krafft Bros. were delivering dairy products in the Pleasant Point area of Fort Erie in their first horse-drawn wagon. The photograph shows the original family name of Krafft. This was the real beginning of the Krafft Bros. She explains the second "f" was dropped after they went to Chicago "probably because such a German name was not popular and one "f" was easier". This was then the beginning of Kraft as we know it today.

Kraft emigrated to Buffalo, New York, in 1902, taking a position as secretary and treasurer of the Shefford Cheese Company. He became a partner in the company the following year, but his partners abruptly dissolved the agreement while he was on a business trip to Chicago — either to inspect the local branch of the company or to supervise it. Stranded in the big city, Kraft used his remaining $65 in capital to rent a horse and wagon and established his own business of buying cheese wholesale and selling it to local grocers. A year later, he would write to a friend: "I haven't got a comparatively large business now, but I know what I can do and in less than five years I am honest in saying I expect to have one of the best wholesale cheese businesses in this City." His business faltering, company tradition has it that Kraft decided to "make God a partner" in his business in 1907; as business improved in the next few years, he brought his brothers Charles Herbert, Frederick, Norman and John Henry into the business.

By 1914, J.L. Kraft & Bros. Company, which later became Kraft Foods Inc opened its first cheese manufacturing plant in Stockton, Illinois. Kraft developed a process, patented in 1916, for pasteurizing cheese so that it would resist spoiling and could be shipped long distances. The company grew quickly, expanding into Canada in 1919.  Kraft saw a large increase in business during World War I when the United States government provided cheese in tins to their armed forces.

J. L. Kraft served as the company's president from 1909 until his death in 1953.  Over the years, Kraft introduced many innovative products and used progressive marketing techniques to make his company one of North America's leading food producers. The company introduced Miracle Whip in 1933 at the Century of Progress world's fair.

Kraft was an amateur jewelry maker; he also supported the Baptist Church and was a strong proponent of religious education for young people.

In the mid-1920s, Kraft began a venture to create a fashionable golf and tennis resort community in Lake Wales, Florida, along with Carl and Bertha Hinshaw. The Florida land bust and the stock market crash in October 1929 spelled the end of the Kraft connection. The Chalet Suzanne opened in the worst year of the Great Depression, 1931, and has been run by successive generations of the Hinshaw family ever since.  Even though Kraft bowed out of the development, a 1920s era Spanish Revival house on the property continues to be called "The Kraft House".

Kraftwood
In 1926, Kraft Foods opened a manufacturing plant in Antigo, Wisconsin.  Back then, there was a train route running from the north woods to Chicago which facilitated both industrial shipping and personal transport for the area. It reminded Kraft so much of his childhood home – the trees, the lakes, the wildlife – that he decided to purchase some land.  This decision would lead to building a sprawling estate, and spending his summers there with his wife Pauline, his family and friends. Kraftwood was built along the edge of the Lake Mashkinosiew, just 20 miles north of downtown Antigo.

Kraft was a close friend of the president and founder of the Orange Crush company, C. J. Howel. Howel, his wife and daughter Annie Jo spent every Summer at Kraftwood from 1927 to at least 1934.

Personal life

J. L. Kraft and his wife Pauline had one daughter, Edith (c. 1916–2012). The Krafts' home, built in 1930 by architect Abraham Epstein, stands at 17 Canterbury Court in Wilmette, Illinois. Kraft has living family members in Illinois and in Fort Erie, Ontario.

A few of Kraft's brothers including, Charles Herbert, Frederick, Norman and John Henry, were executives in Kraft Foods.

The Kraft family farm (located at Bowen Road at Winger Road) in Stevensville, Ontario, still exists as the area has remained agricultural.

Kraft died on February 16, 1953, at the Wesley Memorial Hospital in Chicago. He is interred in the Memorial Park Cemetery in Skokie, Illinois.

Legacy
Kraft was born at 3347 Bowen Road at Winger Road. Known as Kraft House it was built on land farmed by Francis Krafft.

There are a few places in Fort Erie that bears his or his family name but none are located near Stevensville where he was born and resided:

 Kraft - unincorporated area in the southwest end of Fort Erie along the shores of Lake Erie
 Kraft Drain - a short drainage canal located within Kraft and flows out to Lake Erie east of Crescent Creek Beach
 Kraft Lane and Kraft Road - two roads located within Kraft with former a driveway for homes at the foot of Kraft Road along Lake Erie; the latter is a local road

References

External links
From Cheese to Cheese Food: How Kraft persuaded Americans to accept cheese by divorcing it from its microbe-laden origins.
Short biography of J. Kraft at Mondelez International
Long biography of J. Kraft at Kraft Foods Australia
Biography at Harvard Business School's 20th Century American Leaders Database

1874 births
1953 deaths
American company founders
American Mennonites
Canadian company founders
American people of German descent
Canadian emigrants to the United States
Canadian Mennonites
Canadian people of German descent
Kraft Foods people
Businesspeople from Chicago
Processed cheese
People from Wilmette, Illinois
People from Fort Erie, Ontario
American inventors
Canadian inventors